Stefan Lindqvist (18 March 1967 – 1 March 2020) was a Swedish professional footballer who played as a midfielder. During his club career, Lindqvist played for Halmstad, Neuchâtel Xamax, IFK Göteborg, Motherwell and Strømsgodset IF. He made five appearances for the Sweden national team between 1989 and 1990, scoring one goal.

Club career 
Lindqvist played professional football in Sweden, Switzerland, China, and Scotland, but is mostly remembered for his time with IFK Göteborg.

Lindqvist won five Allsvenskan titles with IFK Göteborg, and played every minute of Göteborg's 1994–95 UEFA Champions League campaign which saw Göteborg win their group ahead of FC Barcelona, Manchester United, and Galatasaray before being eliminated by Bayern München in the quarter finals on away goals.

International career 
On 6 May 1989 Lindqvist made his Sweden U21 debut in a 1990 UEFA European Under-21 qualifying game against Poland which Sweden won 4-0.

On 16 August 1989, Lindqvist made his senior debut for Sweden in a friendly game against France, in which he also scored his first and only international goal. On 8 October 1989 he made his competitive senior debut for Sweden in a 1990 FIFA World Cup qualifying game against Albania, which Sweden won 3-1.

Personal life 
He died on 1 March 2020 after a more than 10 year long battle with ALS.

Career statistics

International 

 Scores and results list Sweden's goal tally first, score column indicates score after each Lindqvist goal.

Honours
Neuchâtel Xamax
 Swiss Super Cup: 1990

IFK Göteborg

 Allsvenskan: 1991, 1993, 1994, 1995, 1996
 Svenska Cupen: 1991

References

External links

1967 births
2020 deaths
Swedish footballers
Association football midfielders
Dalian Shide F.C. players
Halmstads BK players
Neuchâtel Xamax FCS players
IFK Göteborg players
Motherwell F.C. players
Strømsgodset Toppfotball players
Neurological disease deaths in Sweden
Deaths from motor neuron disease
Sweden international footballers
Sportspeople from Halmstad
Sportspeople from Halland County